Malmberg is a Swedish surname. Malmberg means "Iron Mountain", with Malm referring to iron ore and Berg referring to mountain. Berg could also reference town or village, so the name would then be "the village in which iron is mined", or "the mountain where we mine iron ore".

Notable people with the surname include:

Aino Malmberg (1865–1933), Finnish writer and politician
Bertil Malmberg (1889–1958), Swedish author, poet, and actor
Betty Malmberg (born 1958), Swedish politician of the Moderate Party
Claes Malmberg (born 1961), Swedish actor and stand-up comedian
Eric Malmberg, Swedish musician
Eric Malmberg (sport wrestler) (1897–1964), Swedish wrestler
Erik Malmberg (1892–1934), Finnish chess player
Harry Malmberg (1925–1976), American second baseman and coach in Major League Baseball
Lauri Malmberg (1888–1948), Finnish general
Malla Malmivaara (born 1982), also known as Laura Malmberg, Finnish actress and singer
Myrra Malmberg, Swedish singer and musical artist
Sylvia Malmberg (Sylvia Liljefors) (born 1944), Swedish curler

Swedish-language surnames